Leander Paes and Cara Black were the defending champions but lost in the quarterfinals to Daniel Nestor and Chan Yung-jan.

Jürgen Melzer and Iveta Benešová defeated Mahesh Bhupathi and Elena Vesnina in the final, 6–3, 6–2 to win the mixed doubles tennis title at the 2011 Wimbledon Championships.

Seeds
All seeds received a bye into the second round. 

  Bob Bryan /  Liezel Huber (quarterfinals, withdrew)
  Max Mirnyi /  Yaroslava Shvedova (second round)
  Nenad Zimonjić /  Katarina Srebotnik (third round, withdrew)
  Mahesh Bhupathi /  Elena Vesnina (final)
  Aisam-ul-Haq Qureshi /  Květa Peschke (second round)
  Rohan Bopanna /  Sania Mirza (quarterfinals)
  Philipp Petzschner /  Barbora Záhlavová-Strýcová (second round)
  Daniel Nestor /  Chan Yung-jan (semifinals)
  Jürgen Melzer /  Iveta Benešová (champions)
  Dick Norman /  Lisa Raymond (second round)
  Mark Knowles /  Nadia Petrova (third round)
  Daniele Bracciali /  Flavia Pennetta (withdrew)
  František Čermák /  Lucie Hradecká (second round)
  Leander Paes /  Cara Black (quarterfinals)
  Andy Ram /  Meghann Shaughnessy (third round)
  David Marrero /  Andrea Hlaváčková (second round)

Draw

Finals

Top half

Section 1

Section 2

Bottom half

Section 3

Section 4

References

External links

2011 Wimbledon Championships on WTAtennis.com
2011 Wimbledon Championships – Doubles draws and results at the International Tennis Federation

X=Mixed Doubles
Wimbledon Championship by year – Mixed doubles